Johann Hommel (also Johannes Homelius, Hummelius, Homilius, Hummel; 2 February 1518, Memmingen – 4 July 1562, Leipzig) was a German astronomer and mathematician.

Work
Hommel was appointed professor of mathematics at the University of Leipzig in 1551.

In 1552 or 1553, Richard Cantzlar introduced transversal dot lines in graduations.  It was a variant of the zigzag line system introduced by Hommel.  Tycho Brahe obtained the zigzag line system from Hommel.

The lunar crater Hommel is named after him.

Sources
 Johann Daniel Schulze, Abriß einer Geschichte der Leipziger Universität, Hinrichs, 1810, p. 48.
 Kevin Krisciunas (1999), "Observatories"

External links

16th-century German astronomers
16th-century German mathematicians
1518 births
1562 deaths
16th-century German writers
16th-century German male writers